William Finnie was mayor of Williamsburg, Virginia from 1783 to 1784.

During the American Revolution he served the southern department of the Continental Army as adjutant quartermaster-general.

The William Finnie House is considered classic Williamsburg architecture.

References

External links 
 Williamsburg Mayors 

18th-century births
Mayors of Williamsburg, Virginia
Continental Army staff officers
Continental Army officers from Virginia
Year of birth unknown
Year of death unknown